Laurent Dubois is the Marcello Lotti Professor of Romance Studies and History and founder of the Forum for Scholars & Publics at Duke University. His studies have focused on Haiti.

Education

Dubois was an undergraduate at Princeton University, graduating in 1992, then earned his Ph.D. from University of Michigan at Ann Arbor in 1998.

Career
Dubois's main areas of research deal with the history of Haiti and the politics of soccer. He has received a Guggenheim Fellowship and a National Endowment for the Humanities Fellowship. His book A Colony of Citizens: Revolution and Slave Emancipation in the French Caribbean, 1787-1804 won the 2005 Frederick Douglass Prize.

Bibliography
Avengers of the New World: The Story of the Haitian Revolution (2004) 
A Colony of Citizens: Revolution and Slave Emancipation in the French Caribbean, 1787-1804 (2004)
An Enslaved Enlightenment: rethinking the Intellectual History of the French Atlantic (2006)
Soccer Empire: The World Cup and the Future of France (2010) 
Haiti: The Aftershocks of History (Holt, 2012)
The Banjo: America’s African Instrument (Harvard University Press, 2016)

References

Living people
Duke University faculty
Princeton University alumni
Horace H. Rackham School of Graduate Studies alumni
Year of birth missing (living people)